Ole Kristian Sjølie (2 April 1923 – 11 November 2015) was a Norwegian painter.

He was born in Fauske. He attended the Norwegian National Academy of Fine Arts from 1946 to 1949, and was one of the pioneers of abstract expressionism in Norway. His works have been bought by the National Gallery of Norway, the Riksgalleriet and the Arts Council Norway. He died in November 2015.

References

1923 births
2015 deaths
People from Fauske
Oslo National Academy of the Arts alumni
20th-century Norwegian painters
Norwegian male painters
21st-century Norwegian painters
20th-century Norwegian male artists
21st-century Norwegian male artists